Stop AIDS Project (SAP) is a United States nonprofit organization which was established in 1985 that works to prevent transmission of HIV among all gay, bisexual, and trans men in San Francisco, California, through multicultural, community based organising.

Internationally recognised as a successful model of grassroots prevention and support, SAP brings diverse gay, bisexual, and trans men together to talk about the challenges and issues posed by human immunodeficiency virus/acquired immunodeficiency syndrome (HIV/AIDS) through neighbourhood outreach, workshops and community forums.

Their work extends beyond education — helping change behaviour, create personal commitment to safer sex, build community support for each individual with the mission statement: HIV Transmission Can Be Prevented.



Mission 
The mission of the Stop AIDS Project is to prevent HIV Transmission among all gay, bisexual and transgender men in San Francisco through collaborative and multicultural, community based organising.

Sources

External links
 Stop Aids Project

HIV/AIDS activism
HIV/AIDS prevention organizations
Non-profit organizations based in San Francisco
Health campaigns
Medical and health organizations based in California